Ralph Arthur Wyatt (September 17, 1917 – March 1990) was an American infielder in Negro league baseball. He played from 1941 to 1946.

References

External links
 and Seamheads

1917 births
1990 deaths
Chicago American Giants players
New York Black Yankees players
Homestead Grays players
Cleveland Buckeyes players
Baseball players from Chicago
20th-century African-American sportspeople